Pierre Boulanger (born 8 August 1987) is a French actor. He is known for the 2003 film Monsieur Ibrahim, where he played a young Jewish boy, Moises "Momo" Schmidt and for 2008 film Nos 18 ans where he played Richard. The young actor was then reported to be concentrating on his studies, and thus was not able to do movies. After two years, he did TV appearances and minor roles in movies. He is best known for his first major English film in 2011, Monte Carlo with Selena Gomez.

Filmography
 Rendez-Vous (English language title - Obsession) (2015) as Michel
 God Help the Girl (2014) as Anton
 The Unlikely Girl (2012) as Luc
 Monte Carlo (2011) as Theo Marchand
 Nos 18 ans (2008) as Richard
 Camarades (2007)
 Camping paradis (2006) as David
 Commissaire Cordier (2006) as Maxime
 Grain de sel (2006) as Maxime
 Poids plume (2005)
 Sauveur Giordano (2005) as Maxime Levain
 L'envers du décor (2005) as Maxime Levain
 Le Proc (2005) as Damien Flamand
 Danger Public (2005) as Damien Flamand
 Les visages d'Alice (2005) as Pierre
 Le Grand vent (2004) as Antoine
 Dans la tête du tueur (2004) as Kevin
 Louis Page (2004) as François
 Un vieil ami (2004) as François
 Monsieur Ibrahim as Momo (2003) - featuring Omar Sharif

References

External links

 Interview with Pierre Boulanger at Eurochannel

1987 births
French male film actors
Living people
Male actors from Paris
Cours Florent alumni
French male television actors
21st-century French male actors
French male stage actors